Thomas E. Sniegoski is an American novelist, comic book writer and pop culture journalist.

Career
A number of Sniegoski's works have been related to the Buffyverse, the fictional universe established by TV series Buffy the Vampire Slayer and Angel.

Thomas has written and collaborated on comics since 1989. Some highlights include working on Vampirella, Punisher, and Batman. Stupid, Stupid Rat Tails was a prequel miniseries to fan favorite indie hit, Bone. Sniegoski collaborated with Bone creator Jeff Smith on the prequel, making him the only writer Smith has ever asked to work on those characters.

Sniegoski was the co-writer of the monthly Angel comic book series, based on the hit show, the Chaos! Comics mini-series Jade: Turn Loose the Dragon and its sequel Jade: Redemption, and fan favorite artist Randy Green's creator-owned series, The Dollz. He has written dozens of comics, including Batman Chronicles #22 and Wolverine/Punisher: Revelation and the Hellboy-inspired three issue mini-series, B.P.R.D: The Hollow Earth was co-written with Christopher Golden and Hellboy creator Mike Mignola. Other work with Golden includes Talent for Boom! Studios.

Tom has been working in the comic book field for ten years, for companies as diverse as Marvel, Image, Dark Horse, Acclaim, Harris, Crusade, Caliber, Spiderbaby, London Night, and most recently, Cartoon Books.

Other work includes Star Trek: Embrace the Wolf for Wildstorm, Batman: Real World for DC, Ghost, Razor, Shi and a Waterworld mini-series which was a sequel to the Universal film, also with Christopher Golden, and several Buffy the Vampire Slayer related projects for Dark Horse.

Bibliography

Buffyverse
 Soul Trade
 Earthly Possessions (with Christopher Golden)
 Hunting Ground (with Christopher Golden)
 Past Lives (with Christopher Golden)
 Giles (with Christopher Golden)
 Monster Island (with Christopher Golden)

Novels
 Force Majeure (with Christopher Golden) (Pocket Books, 2002)

The Fallen (series)
 The Fallen (Pocket Books, 2003)
 Leviathan (Pocket Books, 2003)
 Aerie (Pocket Books, 2003)
 Reckoning (Pocket Books, 2004)
 The End of Days (Pocket Books, 2011)
 Forsaken (Pocket Books, 2012)
 Armageddon (Pocket Books, 2013)

Magic Zero [w/Christopher Golden]
(Series Title originally released as 'Outcast')
 Magic Zero (Aladdin, 2004) – (originally released as 'The Un-Magician')
 Dragon Secrets (Aladdin, 2004)
 Ghostfire (Aladdin, 2005)
 Battle for Arcanum (Aladdin, 2005) – (originally released as 'Wurm War')

The Menagerie (series) [w/Christopher Golden]
 The Nimble Man (Ace, 2004)
 The Tears of Furies (Ace, 2005)
 Stones Unturned (Ace, 2006)
 Crashing Paradise (Ace, 2007)

The Sleeper Conspiracy
 Sleeper Code (Razorbill, 2006)
 Sleeper Agenda (Razorbll, 2006)

Owlboy
 Billy Hooten, Owlboy (Yearling, 2007) 
 The Girl with the Destructo Touch (Yearling, 2007)
 The Terror of Zis-Boom-Bah (Yearling, 2008)
 The Flock of Fury (Yearling, 2008)

Remy Chandler
 A Kiss Before The Apocalypse (Roc, 2008)
 Dancing On The Head of a Pin (Roc, 2009)
 Noah's Orphans (novella published in Mean Streets by Roc, 2009)
 Where Angels Fear To Tread (Roc, 2010)
 A Hundred Words for Hate: A Remy Chandler Novel (Roc, 2011)
 In the House of the Wicked (Roc, 2012)
 Walking In the Midst of Fire (Roc, 2013)
 A Deafening Silence in Heaven (Roc 2015)

Bone
 Stupid, Stupid Rat Tails
 A Quest for the Spark (2011)

Anthologies and collections

Comics
 Talent (with Christopher Golden, Boom! Studios, 2008)

See also
 Buffyverse novels
 Buffyverse comics

References

External links

 
 
 

21st-century American male writers
21st-century American novelists
American comics writers
American fantasy writers
American male novelists
Living people
Place of birth missing (living people)
Urban fantasy writers
Year of birth missing (living people)